The 1966 Manitoba general election was held on June 23, 1966, to elect Members of the Legislative Assembly of the Province of Manitoba, Canada.  It resulted in a third consecutive majority win for the Progressive Conservative Party led by Dufferin Roblin.  Roblin's Tories won 31 seats, against 14 for the Liberal Party, 11 for the New Democratic Party and one for Social Credit.

Results

See also
 List of Manitoba political parties

Riding results

Party key:
PC:  Progressive Conservative Party of Manitoba
L:  Manitoba Liberal Party
NDP:  New Democratic Party of Manitoba
SC:  Manitoba Social Credit Party
Comm:  Communist Party of Canada - Manitoba
Ind:  Independent

Arthur:
(incumbent)James Douglas Watt (PC) 1902
Frank Patmore (L) 1807
C.M. Robson (NDP) 494

Assiniboia:
(incumbent)Stephen Patrick (L) 5168
Stewart Millett (PC) 4800
Charles Norman (NDP) 2943

Birtle-Russell:
Rod Clement (L) 2223
(incumbent)Robert G. Smellie (PC) 2078
Ronald Kostesky (NDP) 446

Brandon:
(incumbent)Reginald Lissaman (PC) 3863
Terry Penton (L) 3696
Harold Weitman (NDP) 1452
Ben Van Hoffen (SC) 508

Brokenhead:
Sam Uskiw (NDP) 1889
George Mulder (PC) 1315
Stanley Copp (Ind L) 669
Ken Skiba (SC) 365

Burrows:
Ben Hanuschak (NDP) 2415
(incumbent)Mark Smerchanski (L) 1487
Walter Paschak (PC) 1301

Churchill (deferred to July 7, 1966):
(incumbent)Gordon Beard (PC) 3159
W.L. Hudson (L) 2192

Cypress:
(incumbent)Thelma Forbes (PC) 2331
Duncan Campbell (L) 1888

Dauphin:
(incumbent)Stewart McLean (PC) 3149
Edward Demkiw (L) 1512
Michael Sotas (NDP) 236

Dufferin:
(incumbent)Homer Hamilton (PC) 2135
Cam Johnston (L) 1280
Walter Taylor (SC) 583

Elmwood:
Russell Doern (NDP) 2765
Tom Snowden (PC) 1816
John Kozoriz (L) 1458
Walter Bowden (SC) 744

Emerson:
(incumbent)John Tanchak (L) 2180
Gabriel Girard (PC) 2015

Ethelbert Plains:
Michael Kawchuk (NDP) 1246
William Paziuk (L) 1182
Melvin Pipe (SC) 884
John Tycholis (PC) 548

Fisher:
Peter Masniuk (PC) 1480
Peter Wagner (NDP) 1368
Arthur Devlin (L) 712
John Palamarchuk (Ind) 97

Flin Flon:
(incumbent)Charles Witney (PC) 1750
Scott Day (NDP) 1090
Mickey Perepeluk (L) 1071

Fort Garry:
(incumbent)Sterling Lyon (PC) 6131
Peter Stokes (L) 2435
Vic Ratsma (NDP) 1769

Fort Rouge:
(incumbent)Gurney Evans (PC) 3767
Frank Muldoon (L) 2451
Leonard Green (NDP) 1845

Gimli:
(incumbent)George Johnson (PC) 1981
Gunnar Eggerston (L) 1021
Zado Zator (NDP) 767

Gladstone:
(incumbent)Nelson Shoemaker (L) 2926
John McPhedran (PC) 1787
William Yuel (NDP) 236

Hamiota:
Earl Dawson (L) 2194
(incumbent)Barry Strickland (PC) 2043
M.S. Antonation (NDP) 412

Inkster:
Sidney Green (NDP) 3644
Olga Fuga (PC) 1713
Ray Babick (L) 1557
William Cecil Ross (Comm) 312

Kildonan:
Peter Fox (NDP) 4644
(incumbent)James Mills (PC) 3808
Jim Smith (L) 2966
Henry Redekopp (SC) 1331

Lac Du Bonnet:
(incumbent)Oscar Bjornson (PC) 1342
James Desilets (L) 1262
Walter Zarecki (NDP) 1151
Ruben Thomas (SC) 474

Lakeside:
(incumbent)Douglas Campbell (L) 1780
Frank Sims (PC) 1428
Francis Mason (NDP) 272

La Verendrye:
(incumbent)Albert Vielfaure (L) 1807
Stan Bisson (PC) 860

Logan:
(incumbent)Lemuel Harris (NDP) 1975
Wally Fox-Decent (PC) 1657
W.M. Suystun (L) 1019

Minnedosa:
(incumbent)Walter Weir (PC) 2136
Don McNabb (L) 1615
Gilbert V. Hutton (SC) 774
John Lee (NDP) 648

Osborne:
(incumbent)Obie Baizley (PC) 3363
Bob Murdoch (NDP) 2189
Howard Loewen (L) 2141

Pembina:
(incumbent)Carolyne Morrison (PC) 2056
Vernon Spangelo (L) 1545
Frederick Hamm (SC) 878
Robert Wallcraft (NDP) 129

Portage la Prairie:
(incumbent)Gordon Johnston (L) 2726
John Christianson (PC) 1991
Sybil Barnett (NDP) 312

Radisson:
(incumbent)Russell Paulley (NDP) 7114
Joseph Guay (L) 4905
Nelson McLean (PC) 2561

Rhineland:
(incumbent)Jacob Froese (SC) 1676
Bruce Gunn (PC) 1324
Alf Loewen (L) 696

River Heights:
Sidney Spivak (PC) 5325
Scott Wright (L) 4083
Lionel Orlikow (NDP) 826

Roblin:
Wally McKenzie (PC) 1798
Joseph Perchaluk (NDP) 1583
Jack Mitchell (L) 863

Rock Lake:
Henry Einarson (PC) 1835
Ronald Gardiner (L) 1691
Jacob Harms (SC) 505
Ernest Sloane (NDP) 333

Rockwood-Iberville:
Harry Enns (PC) 2091
Douglas Trick (L) 1429
Armand De Ryck (NDP) 804
Wilmer Antonius (SC) 228

Rupertsland:
(incumbent)Joseph Jeannotte (PC) 1866
Jean Allard (L) 953
Douglas MacLachlan (NDP) 363

St. Boniface:
(incumbent)Laurent Desjardins (L) 4040
Remi Lafreniere (PC) 1750
Maurice Paul (NDP) 1033

St. George:
(incumbent)Elman Guttormson (L) 2009
Arthur Schwartz (PC) 1418
Stanley Burdett (NDP) 357

St. James:
(incumbent)Douglas Stanes (PC) 3034
Lloyd Axworthy (L) 2244
Jim Rose (NDP) 1487

St. Johns:
(incumbent)Saul Cherniack (NDP) 2427
Dan Zaharia (PC) 1215
Harry Meronek (L) 970
Don Currie (Comm) 326

St. Matthews:
Robert Steen (PC) 2941
Andrew Robertson (NDP) 1950
Donald Cook (L) 1922

St. Vital:
Donald Craik (PC) 4432
Douglas Honeyman (L) 2927
William Hutton (NDP) 2310

Ste. Rose:
(incumbent)Gildas Molgat (L) 2410
Michael Posmituck (PC) 1187
David Duning (SC) 275
Harry Shafransky (NDP) 86

Selkirk:
(incumbent)Thomas Hillhouse (L) 1832
Syndey Sarbitt (PC) 1792
Alan Cooper (NDP) 876
Jens Magnusson (SC) 227

Seven Oaks:
Saul Miller (NDP) 5295
Nathan Nurgitz (PC) 2596
Melvin Fenson (L) 2010

Souris-Lansdowne:
(incumbent)Malcolm McKellar (PC) 1919
Frank Ellis (L) 1556
Margaret Gray (SC) 387
Irene Bauman (NDP) 238

Springfield:
(incumbent)Fred Klym (PC) 1697
Richard Loeb (NDP) 1274
William Lucko (L) 1113

Swan River:
(incumbent)James Bilton (PC) 1591
Gerald Webb (SC) 1185
Claude Dunbar (L) 793
George Higgs (NDP) 602

The Pas:
(incumbent)John Carroll (PC) 2278
Calvin Gibson (L) 1769
Glen Allen (NDP) 288

Turtle Mountain:
Edward Dow (L) 2149
(incumbent)Peter J. McDonald (PC) 2144
Peter Sawatsky (SC) 690
Selwyn Burrows (NDP) 141

Virden:
(incumbent)Donald Morris McGregor (PC) 2092
Roland Tolton (L) 1245
Donald Rowan (SC) 743
Vernon Mazawasicuna (NDP) 256

Wellington:
Philip Petursson (NDP) 3153
(incumbent)Richard Seaborn (PC) 2447
Gurzon Harvey (L) 1117

Winnipeg Centre:
(incumbent)James Cowan (PC) 2982
Ross White (L) 1917
Donald Malinowski (NDP) 1434

Post-election changes

Note:  These by-election results are taken from newspaper reports, and may not exactly match the official returns.

Gordon Beard (PC) became (Ind) in 1968.

Turtle Mountain (results overturned and seat declared vacant, January 30, 1968), March 4, 1968:
Edward Dow (L) 2443
Allan Rose (PC) 2240
Peter Sawatsky (SC) 610

Four seats became vacant in 1968:
Dufferin Roblin (PC, Wolseley) and Rod Clement (Lib, Birtle-Russell) resigned to seek election to the House of Commons of Canada in the 1968 Canadian general election.  Both were unsuccessful.
Gordon Beard (Ind, Churchill) resigned his seat after protesting that the government was not paying sufficient attention to issues affecting northern Manitoba.
Harry Shewman (PC, Morris) died in office.

By-elections for all four ridings were called for February 20, 1969. The Progressive Conservative, Liberal, and New Democratic parties fielded candidates in all four ridings, and there was also an independent candidate in Churchill. The Social Credit Party intended to field a candidate in Morris, but ultimately did not do so.

The results for Birtle-Russell, Morris and Wolseley are taken from the Winnipeg Free Press, 21 February 1969.  The result from Churchill reflects the findings of a judicial review, and is taken from the Winnipeg Free Press, 19 March 1969.

References

Further reading
 

1966 elections in Canada
1966
1966 in Manitoba
June 1966 events in Canada